Ahmed Sadiq (born 7 July 1979) is a Nigerian boxer who participated in the 2004 Summer Olympics for Nigeria. There he was outscored in the first round of the Lightweight (60 kg) division by Cuba's eventual winner Mario César Kindelán Mesa. One year earlier, he won the gold medal in his weight division at the All-Africa Games in Abuja, Nigeria.

References

1979 births
Living people
Olympic boxers of Nigeria
Boxers at the 2004 Summer Olympics
Lightweight boxers
Nigerian male boxers
African Games gold medalists for Nigeria
African Games medalists in boxing
Competitors at the 2003 All-Africa Games